is a New York-based artist working in performance and installation. Sasamoto has collaborated with visual artists, musicians, choreographers, dancers, mathematicians and scholars  is also co-founder of the non-profit interdisciplinary arts organization Culture Push.

Sasamoto has shown her work in theaters, galleries and public spaces in New York and internationally.

Solo shows include "Delicate Cycle" SculptureCenter, New York (2016), Food Rental High Line at the Rail Yards (2015); Wrong Happy Hour, JTT, NYC, New York (2014); Sunny in the Furnace the Kitchen, New York (2014); We Live With Animals Performa 13, New York (2013); Centripetal Run Chocolate Factory Theater, New York (2012); Clothes Line White Rainbow, London (2018); and "Past in a future tense" Bortolami Gallery, New York (2019).

Group exhibitions include: Collection Asian Landscapes, 21st Century Museum of Contemporary Art, Kanazawa, Japan (2018);Travelers: Stepping into the Unknown, NMAO's 40th Anniversary Exhibition, National Museum of Art, Osaka, Japan (2018); 11th Shanghai Biennale: Why Not Ask Again, Power Station of Art, Shanghai, China (2018); Visitors, Governor's Island, New York (2015); Parasophia: Kyoto International Festival of Contemporary Culture 2015, Japan (2015); Pier 54, High Line Art, New York (2014);  Out Of Doubt: Roppongi Crossing 2013, Mori Art Museum, Tokyo (2013); A Spoken Word Exhibition, Galerie Nationale du Jeu de Paume, Paris (2013); Omnilogue: Journey to West, Lalit Kara Academy, New Delhi, India (2012); and Greater New York: 5 Year Review, MoMA PS1, New York (2010). Sasamoto’s work has been featured at biennials include the Gwangju Biennale, South Korea (2012), the Whitney Biennial, New York (2010), and Yokohama Triennial, Japan (2008)

Awards include: The Foundation for Contemporary Arts Grants to Artists award (2017); Grants for Overseas Study by Young Artists, the Pola Art Foundation (2013–2014); Oscar Williams and Gene Derwood Award, The New York Community Trust (2012); Program of Overseas Study for Upcoming Artists, Agency for Cultural Affairs, Japanese Government (2011–2012); Visual Art Grant Award, The Rema Hort Mann Foundation (2007); and Toby Fund Award (2007).

Sasamoto graduated from Wesleyan University and received her MFA from Columbia University in 2007.

References

External links 
 website

1980 births
Living people
21st-century Japanese women artists
Japanese contemporary artists
Japanese performance artists
Women performance artists
Women installation artists
People educated at Atlantic College
People educated at a United World College
Columbia University School of the Arts alumni
Wesleyan University alumni
Japanese expatriates in the United States